The 2016 Adriatic Challenger was a professional tennis tournament played on clay courts. It was the first edition of the tournament which was part of the 2016 ATP Challenger Tour. It took place in Fano, Italy from 8 to 14 August 2016.

Singles main-draw entrants

Seeds

 1 Rankings are as of August 1, 2016.

Other entrants
The following players received wildcards into the singles main draw:
  Andrea Pellegrino
  Francisco Bahamonde
  Gianluigi Quinzi
  Matteo Donati

The following player received entry into the singles main draw using a protected ranking:
  Alberto Brizzi

The following players received entry from the qualifying draw:
  Salvatore Caruso
  Lucas Miedler
  Alessandro Petrone
  Sadio Doumbia

Champions

Singles

  João Souza def.  Nicolás Kicker, 6–4, 6–7(12–14), 6–2

Doubles

  Riccardo Ghedin /  Alessandro Motti def.  Lucas Miedler /  Mark Vervoort, 6–4, 6–4

References

Adriatic Challenger